Proastio  (South Slavic: Дурутово, Durutovo or Дорутово, Dorutovo) is a village located 4 km southeast of Ptolemaida, in Kozani regional unit, within the Greek region of Macedonia. It is situated at an altitude of 639 meters. The postal code is 50200, while the telephone code is +30 24630. At the 2011 census, the population was 649.

References

Populated places in Kozani (regional unit)